Manala is the eighth studio album by Finnish folk metal band Korpiklaani. It was released on August 3, 2012 through Nuclear Blast. "Manala" translated from Finnish to English is "Underworld".

Track listing

Personnel
 Jonne Järvelä – vocals, guitar
 Jarkko Aaltonen – bass
 Matti "Matson" Johansson – drums
 Juho Kauppinen – accordion
 Tuomas Rounakari – violin
 Kalle "Cane" Savijärvi – guitar

References

Korpiklaani albums
2012 albums
Nuclear Blast albums